Arstanbek Beishanalievich Abdyldayev, also known as Arstan Alai (born April 28, 1968) is a Kyrgyz politician and businessman, who was one of the candidates in the 2011 presidential election, most famous for his promise that there would be no winter, and the West would suffer from floods.
He claims to have received an Ayan (Kyrgyz for "vision of future") from the Cosmos, learning about the "universal energy", "universal program" and the role of the Kyrgyz people in the Universe ("Kyrgyz people are... the inheritors of Mankind's original code", "The nomadic people, the Kyrgyz know the language of Nature", "The Kyrgyz nation will take the role of God and save the universe", "Life on Earth began from the Kyrgyz"). According to his words, he has become the "New God" by receiving "the Soul of God" (also known as the "Divine Energy" and "Universe Energy"). 
The Kyrgyz people, he says, are the most ancient nation, whose "heroes" and "shamans" (including the characters of the Epic of Manas) had the "universal energy" and could perform "magical rites". Furthermore, he constantly predicts the "end of the era of technology" and the coming "Golden Era" or "Era of Equality". In the "Golden Era", as he says, "the human gene will be ready and pineal gland will activate to channel the creative power", while "high-frequency energy will fill the air" and cause "Higher Forces" to enter the human body, turning "anatomy into a new kind of astrology". Those "Higher Forces" are often referred to by him as "aliens" or "angelic spirits". He says that through his "Divine Energy" he can cure disease and control the forces of nature. For example,he claims to have sent the COVID-19 alongside "storms and clouds" to China because China hadn't abolished the debt of Kyrgyzstan. Arstanbek and his teachings became an Internet meme in the former Soviet Union, with the most popular video about him gathering more than two million views on YouTube. Abdyldayev participated in the 2017 presidential election as an independent. According to his own words, the Universe has tasked him, the "New God", to become President so the Kyrgyz people can save the Earth from an undetermined catastrophe.

Career

Abdyldayev, a businessman born in Naryn Region of Kyrgyzstan, is the founder of El Uchun party. He took part in 2011 presidential election in Kyrgyzstan but gained less than 0,5 percent, taking the 9th place out of 16 candidates.

He gained an immediate fame after holding a press conference shortly after the election, where he declared that there would be no winter in Kyrgyzstan, and that his home country is the core of the Earth. A Year afterwards, he made the claim that Russian President Vladimir Putin is a "complex biorobot," further adding that the Russian President was capable of saving mankind, but only with Kyrgyzstan's help.

In October 2019, Abdyldayev faced prosecution after having declared himself a God. The prosecution relates to other comments made by Abdyldayev in August of the same year, where he announced that the "soul of God" had come to reside in him, and that he would come to reign over the universe by the end of the following year.

References

1968 births
Living people
Kyrgyzstani businesspeople
Kyrgyzstani politicians
People from Naryn Region
Political Internet memes